Wain is a village and municipality in the district of Biberach in Baden-Württemberg in Germany.

References 

Biberach (district)
Württemberg